Environmental biotechnology is biotechnology that is applied to and used to study the natural environment.  Environmental biotechnology could also imply that one try to harness biological process for commercial uses and exploitation.  The International Society for Environmental Biotechnology defines environmental biotechnology as "the development, use and regulation of biological systems for remediation of contaminated environments (land, air, water), and for environment-friendly processes (green manufacturing technologies and sustainable development)".

Environmental biotechnology can simply be described as "the optimal use of nature, in the form of plants, animals, bacteria, fungi and algae, to produce renewable energy, food and nutrients in a synergistic integrated cycle of profit making processes where the waste of each process becomes the feedstock for another process".

Significance for agriculture, food security, climate change mitigation and adaptation and the MDGs
The IAASTD has called for the advancement of small-scale agro-ecological farming systems and technology in order to achieve food security, climate change mitigation, climate change adaptation and the realisation of the Millennium Development Goals. Environmental biotechnology has been shown to play a significant role in agroecology in the form of zero waste agriculture and most significantly through the operation of over 15 million biogas digesters worldwide.

Significance towards industrial biotechnology

Consider the effluents of starch plant which has mixed up with a local water body like a lake or pond. We find huge deposits of starch which are not so easily taken up for degradation by microorganisms except for a few exemptions. Microorganisms from the polluted site are scan for genomic changes that allow them to degrade/utilize the starch better than other microbes of the same genus. The modified genes are then identified.  The resultant genes are cloned into industrially significant microorganisms and are used for economically processes like in pharmaceutical industry, fermentations... etc..

Similar situations can be encountered in the case of marine oil spills which require cleanup, where microbes isolated from oil rich environments like oil wells, oil transfer pipelines...etc. have been found having the potential to degrade oil or use it as an energy source.  Thus they serve as a remedy to oil spills.

Microbes isolated from pesticide-contaminated soils may capable of utilizing the pesticides as energy source and hence when mixed along with bio-fertilizers, could serve as an insurance against increased pesticide-toxicity levels in agricultural platform.

On the other hand, these newly introduced microorganisms could create an imbalance in the environment concerned. The mutual harmony in which the organisms in that particular environment existed may have to face alteration and we should be extremely careful so as to not disturb the mutual relationships already existing in the environment of both the benefits and the disadvantages would pave way for an improvised version of environmental biotechnology.

Applications and Implications

Humans have long been manipulating genetic material through breeding and modern genetic modification for optimizing crop yield, etc.. There can also be unexpected, negative health and environmental outcomes. Environmental biotechnology is about the balance between the applications that provide for these and the implications of manipulating genetic material. Textbooks address both the applications and implications. Environmental engineering texts addressing sewage treatment and biological principles are often now considered to be environmental biotechnology texts. These generally address the applications of biotechnologies, whereas the implications of these technologies are less often addressed; usually in books concerned with potential impacts and even catastrophic events.

See also
Agricultural biotechnology
Microbial ecology
Molecular Biotechnology

References

External links
International Society for Environmental Biotechnology

Biotechnology
Environmental science